The Seidelin family is a Danish family descending from bailiff and councilman in Helsingør Michel Seidel (died 1616). He was originally from Werder in Pomerania or East Prussia and purchased a house in the city in 1589. Nothing else is known about his background. The name Seidelin was passed on through his daughters who in accordance with German tradition added the suffix -in to their father's name.

Noble family
 
Post Master-General Hans Seidelin (1665-1740), a great grandson of Michel Seidel, was ennobled in 1731.

His daughter, Sophie Seidelin (1693-1741) married royal confessionarius Iver Brinck (1719-1728). Their son, Hans Didrik Brinck-Seidelin (1720-1778), owner of Stamhuset Hagested, was ennobled under the name Brinck-Seidelin in 1752.

Property
Post Master-General Hans Seidelin purchased Hagestedgård at Holbæk in 1730 and Holbæk Ladegård in 1732. Both estates were after his death passed on to first his son Hans Hansen Seideling and then his grandson Hans Didrik de Brinck-Seidelin. In 1752, Hans Diderik de Brinck-Seidelin also purchased Eriksholm. He sold Hagestedgård in 1769. His son Hans de Brinck-Seidelin sold Holbæk Ladegård in 1809 and Eriksholm in 1824.

Søren Seidelin owned Regstrup at Vejle from 1753 to 1755. Claus Seidelin Jessen owned Asserstrup from 1797 to 1803 and then Katrineholm at Vordingborg from 1804 to 182 and constructed its current main building. Claus Friederich Seidelin owned Sparresholm from 1805 to 1807. H.D. Brinck-Seidelin owned Nivaagaard north of Copenhagen from 1810 to 1812. Ludvig Christian Brinck-Seidelin owned Aggersborggård at Køgstør from 1838 to 1846. Carl Frederik Seidelin purchased Mindstrup at Vejle in 1870. The estate was owned by members of the Seidelin family until 2006.

Notable family members
 Andreas Seidelin (1864-1935), jurist and hospital director
 Anna Sophie Seidelin, née Dreiøe (1913-1998), translator
 Bernhard Seidelin (1820-1863), architect
 Carl Seidelin (1833-1909), mathematician
 Christian Seidelin (1874-1962), prist
 Conrad Seidelin (1809-1878), urban planner
 Claus Seidelin (1702-1782), pharmacist and autobiographer
 Ferdinand Emil Seidelin (1822-1908), priest
 Hans Hansen Seidelin (1632-1668), priest
 Hans Seidelin (1665-1740), district governor (amtmand), post master-general and landowner
 Hans Seidelin (1695-1752), Supreme Court justice
 Harald Seidelin (1878-1932), physician
  Henning Seidelin (1904-1987), industrial designer
 Ingeborg Seidelin (1872-1914), painter
  Jens Seidelin (1790-1863), naval officer
  Klaus Henrik Seidelin (1761-1811), publisher printer and editor
  Mogens Seidelin (1913-1993), physician and personal historian
 Mogens Seidelin (born 1935), jazz musician
 Nicol Seidelin (1666-1737), priest
 Paul Seidelin (1906-1981), priest and theologian
  Paulus Seidelin (1813-1872), historian
 Sabinus Seidelin (1819-1904), owner of S. Seidelin.
 V.P. Seidelin (1781-1863), provost

References

External links